Rabbit Hill is a ski resort located on the south bank of the North Saskatchewan River in southwest Edmonton, Alberta, Canada. Rabbit Hill Snow Resort is the largest ski and snowboard facility in the Edmonton Area. Home to an award-winning Snow School, and one of the largest terrain parks in Northern Alberta, the terrain is suitable for newer skiers and will permit advanced skiers to develop their technique.

Rabbit Hill is home to Rabbit Hill Alpine Race Club, Parkland Racers, and Canadian Association for Disabled Skiing- Edmonton.

References

Leduc County
Ski areas and resorts in Alberta